Lincoln Highway or Lincoln Way may refer to:
Lincoln Highway, the first transcontinental highway across the United States of America 
Route of the Lincoln Highway including
Lincoln Highway in New York
Lincoln Highway in New Jersey
Lincoln Highway Hackensack River Bridge
Lincoln Highway Passaic River Bridge
Lincoln Highway (Delaware)
Lincoln Highway in Pennsylvania
Lincoln Highway in West Virginia
Lincoln Highway in Ohio
Lincoln Highway in Indiana
Lincoln Highway in Illinois
Lincoln Highway (Iowa)
Lincoln Highway Bridge (Tama, Iowa)
Lincoln Highway in Greene County, Iowa
Lincoln Highway (Nebraska)
Lincoln Highway (Omaha)
Lincoln Highway in Colorado
Lincoln Highway in Wyoming
Lincoln Highway in Utah
Lincoln Highway Bridge (Dugway Proving Ground, Utah)
Lincoln Highway in Nevada
Lincoln Highway in California
Lincoln Highway, South Australia
Lincoln Way (San Francisco), a major thoroughfare in San Francisco, California
Lincoln Tunnel, between New Jersey and New York